88 Armoured Regiment is an armoured regiment of the Indian Army.

History
The regiment was raised in September 1979 at Ahmednagar. The first commandant was Lieutenant Colonel (later Brigadier) Iesh Rikhy. The regiment was initially equipped with Vijayanta tanks and later converted to T-72 tanks. It has an all-India, all-class composition, drawing troops from various castes and religions. Brigadier Satish Kumar is the current Colonel of the Regiment.

Gallantry awards and honours
The regiment has won the following awards – 
COAS Commendation Cards – 1
The regiment with its Vijayanta tanks took part in the Republic Day parade in 1990.

References
	

Armoured and cavalry regiments of the Indian Army from 1947
Military units and formations established in 1979